A list of universities and colleges affiliated with the Christian churches and churches of Christ, part of the Restoration Movement.

 
Christian churches and churches of Christ
Universities and colleges affiliated with the Christian churches and churches of Christ